The 1884 Rutgers Queensmen football team represented Rutgers University in the 1884 college football season. The Queensmen compiled a 3–4 record and were outscored by their opponents, 184 to 155. The team had no coach, and its captain was John DeWitt.

Schedule

References

Rutgers
Rutgers Scarlet Knights football seasons
Rutgers Queensmen football